The 1989 Fernleaf Classic was a women's tennis tournament played on outdoor hard courts in Wellington, New Zealand and was part of the Category 1 tier of the 1989 WTA Tour. It was the 2nd edition of the tournament and was held from 6 February until 12 February 1989. First-seeded Conchita Martínez won the singles title.

Finals

Singles

 Conchita Martínez defeated  Jo-Anne Faull 6–1, 6–2
 It was Martínez's 1st singles title of the year and the 2nd of her career.

Doubles

 Elizabeth Smylie /  Janine Thompson defeated  Tracey Morton /  Heidi Sprung 7–6(7–3), 6–1
 It was Smylie's 1st title of the year and the 22nd of her career. It was Thompson's 1st title of the year and the 3rd of her career.

See also
 1989 BP National Championships – men's tournament

References

External links
 ITF tournament edition details
 Tournament draws

Fernleaf Classic
Wellington Classic
Fern
February 1989 sports events in New Zealand